The Mystery of Temple Court is a surviving 1910 silent film drama short produced and distributed by the Vitagraph Company of America.

The film survives in the Library of Congress collection.

References

External links
The Mystery of Temple Court at IMdb.com

1910 films
American silent short films
Vitagraph Studios short films
American black-and-white films
Silent American drama films
1910 drama films
1910 short films
1910s American films